Etatorquevirus is a genus of viruses in the family Anelloviridae, in group II in the Baltimore classification. It includes five species.

Taxonomy
The genus contains the following species:

 Torque teno felid virus 1
 Torque teno felid virus 2
 Torque teno felid virus 3
 Torque teno felid virus 4
 Torque teno viverrid virus 3

References

External links 
ICTV Virus Taxonomy 2009
UniProt Taxonomy
 
 ICTVdb
 ViralZone: Etatorquevirus

Anelloviridae
Virus genera